A freshwater marsh is a non-tidal, non-forested marsh wetland that contains fresh water, and is continuously or frequently flooded. Freshwater marshes primarily consist of sedges, grasses, and emergent plants. Freshwater marshes are usually found near the mouths of rivers, along lakes, and are present in areas with low drainage like abandoned oxbow lakes.  It is the counterpart to the salt marsh, an upper coastal intertidal zone of bio-habitat, which is regularly flushed with sea water.

Vegetation 

Freshwater marshes are highly productive and therefore can support a large biodiversity of vegetation. Vegetation is a key component in determining the structure of a freshwater marsh. In a freshwater marsh, there are emergent plants, floating plants, floating leaved and submerged. The primary plant in freshwater marshes are emergent plants. Emergent plants are plants with soft stems and are highly adapted to live in saturated soils. Freshwater marshes have a lengthy growing season and contain high nutrient levels in the water and substrate, which contribute to an overall high net primary production. Some of the most common plants in these areas are cattails, water lilies, arrowheads, and rushes.

Animals 
Many types of animals use freshwater marshes for habitat at some point in their life cycles. Birds, amphibians, reptiles, fish and macro-invertebrates can be found within freshwater marshes. Birds use freshwater marshes for nesting. Common species of birds found in a freshwater marsh include ducks, geese, swans, songbirds, swallows, coots, and black ducks. Although shallow marshes do not tend to support many fish, they are used as a nursery to raise young. The deeper ones are home to many species, including large fish such as the northern pike and carp.

Soil 
Soils contain organic matter, air, water and mineral matter. The soil has very slow decomposition rates and is often black or brown. Soils are characterized by hue, chroma and value. The soils in wetlands are often hydric in nature, which means they are completely saturated and have no oxygen.

Hydrology 
Freshwater marshes are dynamic ecosystems. Aspects of the water like depth, velocity, oxygen concentration, and temperature change frequently. Marshes can be classified based on their hydrology. Marshes can be flooded permanently, intermittently, temporarily, seasonally, and semi-permanently. Groundwater reserves, water moving across the surface and precipitation are the three main sources of water in marshes.

Functions and Services 
Wetlands have many services and functions that benefit the Earth. Marshes can remove carbon from the atmosphere and store it in their biomass or the ground. Many of the wide variety of species that freshwater marshes can support, provide services to humans. Many different types of food are produced within a freshwater marsh like fruits, rice, vegetables like taro, and fish. Freshwater marshes can also provide clothing in the form of pelts and materials for building such as reeds. Freshwater marshes also provide recreational services like fishing, bird-watching, water fowl hunting, and trapping. Another important function of marshes is flood mitigation. Marshes can slow down the rate at which water is travelling and create a buffer zone to stop flooding.

Restoration 
There are many different techniques to restoring a wetland. One common way freshwater marshes are restored is restoration of channelized rivers. When rivers are channelized and straightened, the marshes alongside the rivers disappear. Reverting rivers back to their natural state will allow nearby marshes to form again. Another way to restore freshwater marshes is to break down levees, dikes, and berms that impede rivers from flooding. Another technique to restore freshwater marshes is to re-plan cities and infrastructure to incorporate wetlands instead of draining them to build on them.

Notable Marshes

Florida Everglades 
The Florida Everglades represent the largest contiguous freshwater marsh in the entire world. The Everglades is home to animals such as the American Alligator, the Apple Snail and the Everglade Snail Kite. Alligators create depressions in the mud that retain water during the dry season. These wet depressions or alligator holes are important to fish, reptiles, and amphibians during the dry season. The vegetation of the Everglades include grasses, sedges, and other emergent hydrophytes. Continued human development, including drainage for development and polluted agriculture runoff, as well as alterations in the water cycle, threaten the existence of the Everglades.

Okavango Delta 
The Okavango Delta in Botswana is one of Africa's largest freshwater marshes. Before the flowing water reaches the Okavango Delta, it comes from Angola and passes through Namibia. This marsh is so large that it can support commercial and recreational fishing. There are many tree islands within the Okavango marsh due to termites. Termites colonies build mounds in the dry season that later become flooded. The crowns of the mounds stay above water level and can support trees and other vegetation. The tree islands become a hot spot for biodiversity within the marsh. Continuous proposals for rerouting the river that fills the marsh is the main cause of concern for the future of this wetland.

Rift Valley 
Rift Valley is located in Eastern Africa. Lake Naivasha is surrounded by tropical, freshwater marshes in the extensive 6,500 kilometer rift valley. These marshes are home to cattail, papyrus, and floating mats of other plants.  This marsh is also home to ducks, herons, and crayfish.  The rifting in the valley is enlarging the lake, creating more wetlands in the surrounding area.

Mesopotamian Marshlands 
The Mesopotamian Marshlands are located in southern Iraq and Iran.  The confluence of the Tigris and Euphrates Rivers create the Mesopotamian Marshlands.  The Mesopotamian Marshlands were once the largest wetland ecosystem in the Middle East, covering an area of 15,000 to 20,000 square kilometers.  In the 1980s and 1990s, this marshland was drained by upstream dams and water control structures, down to 10% of the original area.  The marshland is located on the intercontinental flyway of migratory birds and is used by two-thirds of West Asia's water fowl. The marsh is currently dominated by an invasive grass, Phragmites australis.

See also

Brackish marsh
Salt marsh

References

Coastal geography
Marshes